John Cutler (born 8 June 1962) is a competitive sailor for New Zealand who won a bronze medal in the Finn Class at the 1988 Olympic Games in Seoul. He was also selected for the 1992 Summer Olympics in Barcelona and was a sailing coach for the New Zealand team at the 1996 Summer Olympics in Atlanta. Cutler has subsequently competed for a number of different syndicates in the America's Cup. He was born in Manchester, England.

He sailed for ALL4ONE Challenge in the 2010 Louis Vuitton Trophy Dubai.

Current – 2015
 Tactician on J Class Lionheart
 Coach for Yachting New Zealand – Finn Class

Sailing regatta highlights
 Cope del Rey 2014 “Bella Mente” – 2nd
 Palma Vela Mini Maxi 2013 “Bella Mente” – Winner
 Rolex Maxi World Championship 2012 “Bella Mente” – Winner
 J Class Falmouth Regatta 2012 “Ranger” – Winner
 Eight Meter World Champion 2011 “Hollandia” – Winner
 Rolex Giraglia Inshore Series 2011 “Pace” – 2nd
 Copa Del Rey TP52 2008 “Desafio” – Winner
 Two time winner of the Admirals Cup (Dutch Team and US Team)
 Mumm 36 World Champion
 Three time World Match Racing champion
 Bronze Medal −1988 Olympics, Finn class

America's Cup
 Tactician and Technical Director with Desafío Español for America's Cup 33 until syndicate ended May 2009
 Tactician and Technical Director with Desafío Español for America's Cup 32 (2007) Louis Vuitton Cup Semi-Finalist
 Tactician and Sailing Director with Oracle BMW Racing for America's Cup 31 (2003) Louis Vuitton Cup Finalist
 Helmsman with America True for America's Cup 30 (2000) Louis Vuitton Cup Semi-Finalist
 Helmsman with Nippon Challenge for America's Cup 29 (1995) Louis Vuitton Cup Semi-Finalist
 Tactician with Nippon Challenge for America's Cup 28 (1992) Louis Vuitton Cup Semi-Finalist

Other
 Co-Author “Understanding Match Racing” (North Sails CD) now in its fourth edition
 Authored rules and tactics for Virtual Spectator (America's Cup 30 & 31)
 Coach – New Zealand Olympic Sailing Team Barcelona (1992) and Atlanta (1996).

References 

 Biography at New Zealand Olympic Committee website

1962 births
Living people
New Zealand male sailors (sport)
Olympic sailors of New Zealand
Olympic bronze medalists for New Zealand
Sailors at the 1988 Summer Olympics – Finn
Sailors at the 1992 Summer Olympics – Finn
Olympic medalists in sailing
Medalists at the 1988 Summer Olympics
Oracle Racing sailors
2007 America's Cup sailors
2003 America's Cup sailors
2000 America's Cup sailors
1995 America's Cup sailors
1992 America's Cup sailors